Li Haotong (born 3 August 1995) is a Chinese professional golfer.

Career
Li turned professional in 2011 and played his early pro career on the OneAsia Tour and PGA Tour of Australasia. He also competed in a few European Tour events. Li qualified for the new PGA Tour China in 2014, where he won three times, led the tour's Order of Merit to earn full Web.com Tour status, and was the first Chinese member of the Web.com Tour. He finished 11th in his first Web.com Tour event, the Panama Claro Championship. He went on to maintain his 2016 Web.com Tour card by finishing 49th on the money list.

During the middle of his Web.com Tour season, Li traveled back to China and entered the inaugural Shenzhen International, an event added to the European Tour for 2015. Following a first-round 71 and a second-round 73, Li managed a third-round of seven-under-par 65, alongside two-time Masters champion Bubba Watson, who shot a 74. At that stage it was the joint lowest round of the tournament alongside Spain's Pablo Larrazábal. Speaking of the experience of playing alongside Watson, Li said, "He's pretty nice guy, so I very much enjoyed playing with him. I hit a lot of greens and made a lot of birdies. I was pretty lucky also." Watson praised the youngster, saying, "He's hitting the ball really well. He's making a lot of putts. The key around a golf course is a lot of putts and he made a lot of putts today." On day four of the tournament, Li shot a round of 67, but had to watch on TV to see if he would become the first Chinese player to win a European Tour event on home soil. Thailand's Kiradech Aphibarnrat, who had led for the majority of the tournament, managed to draw level at 12-under-par and force a playoff, which he won by one shot.

The next week, Li finished 6th at the Volvo China Open before returning to the Web.com Tour. At the conclusion of the Web.com Tour year, Li played five consecutive events in Asia, including the 2015 WGC-HSBC Champions in Shanghai. As one of six Chinese invites, he finished T7, the highest ever PGA Tour finish for a Chinese-born player.

On 1 May 2016, he captured his first European Tour victory by winning the Volvo China Open.

In 2017, Li mainly played on the European Tour, and also had some breakthrough at the majors. He qualified for the U.S. Open via the European sectional in England. He made the cut, but finished in solo-68th after consecutive rounds of 80's during the weekend. At the Open Championship, Li shot a final round of 63, and finished third-place alone. This result broke the records set by any Chinese players at the majors. Previously, Liang Wenchong shot 64 in the third round of the 2010 PGA Championship, where he finished eighth. Li's third-place finish at the Open Championship also qualified him for the 2018 Masters Tournament.

In January 2018, Li earned his second victory on the European Tour, at the Omega Dubai Desert Classic. In the process, he set a new tournament record. On 4 November 2018, Li lost a playoff to Justin Rose at the Turkish Airlines Open, a Rolex Series event.

In December 2019, Li played on the International team at the 2019 Presidents Cup at Royal Melbourne Golf Club in Australia. The U.S. team won 16–14. Li went 0–2–0 and including a loss in his Sunday singles match against Dustin Johnson.

At the 2020 PGA Championship, Li held the 36-hole lead by two strokes at 8 under par after opening rounds of 67-65. He shot 73-69 on the weekend and finished T17.

In June 2022, Li won the BMW International Open beating Thomas Pieters in a playoff. He holed a 50-foot birdie putt on the first extra hole. It was Li's first win in over four years.

Professional wins (7)

European Tour wins (3)

1Co-sanctioned by the OneAsia Tour

European Tour playoff record (1–2)

OneAsia Tour wins (2)

1Co-sanctioned by the European Tour

PGA Tour China wins (3)

Results in major championships
Results not in chronological order in 2020.

CUT = missed the half-way cut
WD = withdrew
"T" = tied
NT = No tournament due to COVID-19 pandemic

Summary

Most consecutive cuts made – 3 (twice)
Longest streak of top-10s – 1

Results in The Players Championship

CUT = missed the halfway cut

Results in World Golf Championships
Results not in chronological order prior to 2015.

1Cancelled due to COVID-19 pandemic

QF, R16 = Round in which player lost in match play
NT = No tournament
"T" = tied

Team appearances
Professional
World Cup (representing China): 2016, 2018
EurAsia Cup (representing Asia): 2018
Presidents Cup (representing the International team): 2019

References

External links

Chinese male golfers
PGA Tour golfers
European Tour golfers
Olympic golfers of China
Golfers at the 2016 Summer Olympics
Sportspeople from Hunan
1995 births
Living people
20th-century Chinese people
21st-century Chinese people